Zenone may refer to:

 Zenone, an Italian Catholic saint
 Zenone Benini (1902–1976), Italian industrialist and Fascist politician
 Zenone Veronese, an Italian painter of the Renaissance period

See also
 Zeno (disambiguation)
 Zenon (disambiguation)
 San Zenone (disambiguation)